Beckinsale is a surname. Notable people with the name include:

 Kate Beckinsale (born 1973), English actress
 Mary Beckinsale, English art historian
 Richard Beckinsale (1947–1979), English actor
 Samantha Beckinsale (born 1966), English actress

English-language surnames